Piatra is a commune in Orhei District, Moldova. It is composed of two villages, Jeloboc and Piatra.

References

Communes of Orhei District